Pangodi Lake is a lake in Kambja Parish, Tartu County, Estonia.

See also
List of lakes of Estonia

References

Kambja Parish
Lakes of Tartu County